Jack Raymond Bruner (July 1, 1924 – June 24, 2003) was a professional baseball pitcher. He played two seasons in Major League Baseball.

Signed by the Chicago White Sox in 1949 as a bonus baby, he debuted in the major leagues three days after signing. In 1950, he was traded to the St. Louis Browns. After his two full seasons of time were complete, he was sent to the minor leagues, where he pitched for four more seasons, ending his career in 1954 with the Sioux City Soos.

External links

Sportspeople from Waterloo, Iowa
Major League Baseball pitchers
Chicago White Sox players
St. Louis Browns players
Waterloo White Hawks players
Colorado Springs Sky Sox (WL) players
San Antonio Missions players
Toronto Maple Leafs (International League) players
Wichita Indians players
Birmingham Barons players
Sioux City Soos players
Iowa Hawkeyes baseball players
Baseball players from Iowa
1924 births
2003 deaths
All-American college baseball players